William Lampe (29 August 1902 – 22 December 1987) was an Australian cricketer. He played two first-class matches for New South Wales between 1927/28 and 1928/29.

See also
 List of New South Wales representative cricketers

References

External links
 

1902 births
1987 deaths
Australian cricketers
New South Wales cricketers
Sportspeople from Wagga Wagga